Michael W. Taylor (born 25 April 1966, in Los Angeles) is a leading discoverer of champion and tallest trees - most notably coast redwoods. In 2006, Taylor co-discovered the tallest known tree in the world, a coast redwood (Sequoia sempervirens) now named "Hyperion". He also discovered "Helios" and "Icarus", the 2nd and 3rd tallest.

National Geographic made a video about the discovery and measuring of Hyperion. The discovery made headlines.

Taylor and Sillett have collaborated and measured remarkable previously unknown redwoods. Their discoveries have fueled research and public interest in coast redwoods, which are now a World Heritage Site.

Michael is a main character of the non-fiction book (2007) The Wild Trees. The narrative includes how Taylor began exploring for tall trees, measuring tallest trees, and later networking with Pacific coast forest researchers.

Taylor co-discovered the largest known  coast redwood named Lost Monarch in the Grove of Titans, as well as Iluvatar  in Prairie Creek Redwoods State Park.

Tallest tree discoveries 

Redwoods: Helios and Icarus were discovered in 2006, shortly before Hyperion. Hyperion was the record height coast redwood that prompted National Geographic Society and Save-the-Redwoods League to coordinate a documentary. These are just 3 of many coast redwoods over  feet which Michael Taylor discovered. The details are chronicled at www.talltreesclub.org

Pines: Discovery of 4 new world's tallest pine trees, January, 2011.

Largest coast redwood discoveries 

Taylor discovered and co-discovered the largest known coast redwoods. The locations of these trees have not been disclosed by the National and California State Parks to the general public. For more information see www.landmarktrees.net

Education 
Taylor attended Humboldt State University from 1984 to 1987 studying forestry, attended San Diego State University in 1988, returned to Humboldt State University 1992-94 completing a Bachelor of Science in environmental engineering.

Location 
Michael Taylor resides in northern California.

References 

1966 births
Living people
American foresters